Epipsestis manmiaoyangi is a moth of the family Drepanidae first described by Gyula M. László and Gábor Ronkay in 1999. It is found in Taiwan.

The wingspan is 33–37 mm. Adults are on wing in late autumn.

References

Moths described in 1999
Thyatirinae